Sir John Ernle, or Ernele (1647 – 25 October 1686), of Burytown, Broad Blunsdon, Wiltshire, served as a Royal Navy captain in the Third Anglo-Dutch War, and was briefly a Member of Parliament for Calne.

Career
The son of Sir John Ernle, Chancellor of the Exchequer, Ernle was educated at Exeter College, Oxford, after which he became a member of Lincoln's Inn. He went on to serve in the Royal Navy, commanding ships of the line.

At the Battle of Solebay of 1672, Ernle commanded HMS Dover, and during the battle he saved Sir John Harman and the Charles from a fire ship. By the summer of 1678, he was in command of the new 64-gun ship of the line HMS Defiance. Although he lived chiefly in Herefordshire, he was elected member of Parliament for Calne in 1685, about a year before his death; the property inherited from his father included Whetham House, near Calne.

John Aubrey says of him: 

Ernle was knighted in 1673. On 6 December 1674 he married Vincentia Kyrle, co-heir of Sir John Kyrle, 2nd Baronet, of Homme House, Much Marcle, Herefordshire. They had two children: Hester (1676–1723) and John Kyrle Ernle (1682–1725).

He died on 25 October 1686 and was buried at Much Marcle.

Notes

1647 births
1686 deaths
Alumni of Exeter College, Oxford
English MPs 1685–1687
Members of Lincoln's Inn
Ernle family
17th-century Royal Navy personnel
Royal Navy officers
Royal Navy personnel of the Third Anglo-Dutch War
Members of the Parliament of England (pre-1707) for Calne